Ganodonta (so named from the presence of bands of enamel on the teeth) were a group of specialized North American Lower and Middle Eocene mammals of uncertain affinity. The group includes Hemiganus, Psittacotherium and Conoryctes from the Puerco, Calamodon and Hemiganus from the Wasatch, and Slylinodon from the Bridger Eocene. With the exception of Conorycles, in which it is longer, the skull is short and suggests affinity to the sloths, as does what little is known of the limb bones.

The dentition, too, is of a type which might well be considered ancestral to that of the Edentata. For instance, the molars when first developed have tritubercular summits, but these soon become worn away, leaving tall columnar crowns, with a subcircular surface of dentine exposed at the summit of each. Moreover, while the earlier types have a comparatively full series of teeth, all of which are rooted and invested with enamel, in the later forms the incisors are lost, and the cheek-teeth never develop roots but grow continuously throughout life.

These and other features induced Dr Jacob Lawson Wortman (1856–1926) to regard the Ganodonta as an ancestral suborder of Edentata; but this view is not accepted by Prof. W. B. Scott. Teeth provisionally assigned to Calamodon have been obtained from the Lower Tertiary deposits of Switzerland.

References

Eocene mammals